Ahmed Al Saadi (Arabic:أحمد السعدي) (born 2 October 1995) is a Qatari footballer who plays for Qatar as a midfielder, most recently for Al-Rayyan.

External links

References

Qatari footballers
1995 births
Living people
Umm Salal SC players
Aspire Academy (Qatar) players
Lekhwiya SC players
K.A.S. Eupen players
Al Ahli SC (Doha) players
Al-Rayyan SC players
Qatar SC players
Qatar Stars League players
Qatari expatriate footballers
Association football midfielders
Footballers at the 2018 Asian Games
Asian Games competitors for Qatar
Qatari expatriate sportspeople in Belgium